Hålisrimen Peak is a peak,  high, rising  northwest of Halisstonga Peak in the Kurze Mountains of Queen Maud Land, Antarctica. It was mapped by Norwegian cartographers from surveys and air photos by the Sixth Norwegian Antarctic Expedition (1956–60) and named Hålisrimen (the slippery ice frost).

References

Mountains of Queen Maud Land
Princess Astrid Coast